Colin Robert Vaughan Campbell, 7th Earl Cawdor, DL (born 30 June 1962) is a Scottish peer, landowner, and architect. 

A member of the House of Lords from 1993 to 1999, he is Vice-Lord Lieutenant of Nairnshire.

Life
Born in Carmarthen, Cawdor is the elder son of Hugh John Vaughan Campbell, 6th Earl Cawdor, and his first wife Cathryn Hinde, a daughter of Major-General Sir Robert Hinde, and was educated at Eton College and St Peter's College, Oxford. On his father's death in 1993, he succeeded him as Earl Cawdor of Castlemartin, Viscount Emlyn, of Emlyn, and Baron Cawdor of Castlemartin.
He also inherited a Scottish estate of some 50,000 acres and Cawdor Castle, which is one of the locations of the Shakespeare play Macbeth. 

In 2006, he launched a project called "New Future for Nairn", recalling that the town of Nairn had once been popular for seaside holidays and known as "the Brighton of the North". In 2007 came more detailed plans to develop 274 acres of land at Delnies, on the outskirts of the town, for  new housing, a sports centre, and an arts centre.

Personal life
On 21 October 1994, on 21 October 1994, at  Adare, County Limerick, Cawdor married Lady Isabella Stanhope, youngest daughter of William Stanhope, 11th Earl of Harrington. She was a Vogue fashion editor who has since become an interior decorator. They have four children:

Lady Jean Campbell (born 1997)
James Chester Campbell, Viscount Emlyn (born 1998)
Lady Eleanor Campbell (born 2000)
Lady Beatrice Campbell (born 2004)

In 2001, Cawdor clashed with his stepmother when she tried to have him evicted from the castle, so that she could continue to occupy it. In 2005, he and his wife and children were living at Drynachan Lodge, an eight-bedroom hunting lodge by the River Findhorn.

In 2007, as "Earl Colin & Countess Isabella of Cawdor", Vogue listed the Cawdors among its best-dressed couples.

On 23 June 2013, The New York Times quoted Cawdor's elder sister Liza Campbell in an article which described male-preference primogeniture as a legacy form of sexism.

References

External links 

  " Out, out, damn GMOs" article in The Daily Telegraph published 21 July 2001.
 Liza Campbell. " I'm not just a chromosomal faux pas", The Daily Telegraph, 19 January 2004
 Martin Hodgson and Stephen Khan, "This Britain", The Independent, 4 June 2006

1962 births
People educated at Eton College
Deputy Lieutenants
Earls in the Peerage of the United Kingdom
Living people
20th-century Scottish architects
7
21st-century Scottish architects
Cawdor